A communal meal is a meal eaten by a group of people. It often but not always serves a social, symbolic and/or ceremonial purpose. For some, the act of eating communally defines humans as compared to other species. Communal meals have long been of interest to both archeologists and anthropologists. Much scholarly work about communal eating has focused on special occasions but everyday practices of eating together with friends, family or colleagues is also a form of communal eating.

Communal eating is closely bound up with commensality (the sociological concept of eating with other people). Communal eating is also bound up with eating and drinking together to cement relations, to establish boundaries and hierarchies as well as for pleasure.

Some examples of communal meals are the Native American potlatch, the Christian Agape feast, the Thanksgiving meal, cocktail parties, and company picnics.

See also
 
 Refectory

References

Eating parties
Communal eating